David J. Somers (born 1953) is an American politician and fisheries biologist serving as the Snohomish County Executive, an office he has held since 2016. Somers previously served on the Snohomish County Council, representing the 5th district in the eastern portion of the county.

Early life and career

Somers was raised in Napa, California and studied at Lewis & Clark College in Portland, Oregon, before moving to the Seattle area to attend the University of Washington. There, he earned a bachelor's degree in fisheries science and later returned to complete a master's degree in forest ecology. Somers was employed as a fisheries biologist by the Tulalip Tribes from 1979 to 1997.

Career

County Council

Somers was elected to the Snohomish County Council from the 5th district in 1997, defeating incumbent Democrat R.C. "Swede" Johnson in the primary election and facing a Republican write-in candidate in the general election. Somers was elected on a platform of making real estate developers accountable for strains on infrastructure created by new housing in the county, including roads and schools.

Somers was defeated in 2001 by Republican Jeff Sax, whose campaign called Somers a "committed socialist" before retracting the statement. Sax favored local control of land use, opposing the state's Washington State Growth Management Act and federal policies. Somers campaigned again in 2005, facing Sax for his former council seat, and won by a narrow margin. Somers was re-elected to a third term in 2009, defeating Republican restaurant owner Steve Dana.

During his time on the County Council, Somers focused on land use regulation and strengthening environmental protections.

County Executive

Somers announced his candidacy for the county executive office in May 2015, challenging incumbent Democrat John Lovick, appointed to the position in 2013 after the resignation of Aaron Reardon. In the primary election, Somers narrowly beat Lovick, and the two Democrats advanced to the general election ahead of two Republican an independent candidate. Somers won the general election and was sworn into office as the county's fifth executive in January 2016. State Representative Hans Dunshee was chosen in February to complete the rest of Somers's term in the County Council.

In addition to his duties as County Executive, Somers joined the Sound Transit Board in January 2016 and was named the board chair in January 2017. Somers was also elected the vice president of the Puget Sound Regional Council, a regional planning organization, in January 2016.

Personal life

Somers met his wife Elaine while the two were in the University of Washington Husky Marching Band. Somers played the tuba for two years, served as Drum Major for three years and marched playing bass drum at the 1978 Rose Bowl.

References

Living people
1953 births
Snohomish County Councillors
University of Washington College of the Environment alumni
People from Monroe, Washington
People from Napa, California
Tulalip Tribes
Lewis & Clark College alumni
21st-century American biologists